Shirly Pinto (born 15 March 1989) is an Israeli Deaf social-political activist, who served as Member of Knesset for National Unity.

Biography 
Pinto was born to Deaf parents, and raised in the Krayot. Her mother is Deaf and blind, and part of the Nalaga'at theater group.

Pinto attended the Carmel Zvulun Regional High School in Kibbutz Yagur, electing to study  graphic design and social science. She received  a complete matriculation diploma, graduating with honors.

Pinto made most of her childhood with her mother's parents, as well as with her signing parents. This way she acquired a full knowledge of two languages, Israeli sign language alongside the Hebrew language, which gave her emotional strength and self esteem between the two worlds. Since her childhood, she has seen the difficulty and lack of linguistic accessibility in her parents, who coped daily with the authorities and the general public. Pinto's life was also a daily struggle because of a lack of awareness in the public. When she grew up, she decided to devote her life to change this reality of Deaf and hard of hearing people.

At the age of 18, despite being exempted from compulsory military service, Pinto enlisted in the Israel Defense Forces. She served in the Israeli Air Force Technical Corps. After the initial two-year service, Pinto continued as a career officer, and in 2009 she received an outstanding medal from the Air Force commander and was recognized by President Shimon Peres for her exceptional service.

In 2011 Pinto enrolled for a law degree at the Netanya Academic College, and participated the college's excellence program. During her studies she participated in a delegation to the International Labour Organization at the United Nations in Geneva. In 2013 she worked as a paralegal for Judge Benjamin Arnon in Israel's Central District Court. In 2014 she interned for Member of Knesset Karin Elharar, handling legislation, public appeals and drafting policies to aid people with disabilities.

Since 2016 Pinto has been a lecturer for the studies of Sign Language Interpreting, at Bar-Ilan University.

In 2017 Pinto interned at the law office of Furth, Wilensky, Mizrachi and Knaani.

Public activism 

In 2014 Pinto joined the "Shema for education and rehabilitation of deaf and hard of hearing children and youth", where she was later employed as an instructor and an informal educational activity coordinator. Later she was appointed as a manager of the regional Gush Dan club. In May 2015, Pinto initiated an Israeli delegation to India, for an assistance and a legal-educational counseling to deaf children and youth in Indore.

In 2016 she established  with other deaf founders. It's goals are to promote the status of Deaf and hard of hearing people who used sign language; to recognize the equality of sign language and spoken languages; and to create an awareness to the need of the Deaf to be accessible and accepted by the general public.

Pinto led the "I sign I am Equal" public campaign for changing the consciousness of the importance of sign language in public, and for promoting legislation of the Israeli Sign Language as a recognized language in Israel. In this campaign, she led an awareness week of the Deaf people, under the slogan "I sign, I am whole" (a Hebrew word play). The campaign swept hundreds of thousands, and  Education Minister Naftali Bennett joined. Following the campaign, Ben-Gurion University of the Negev was the first university in Israel to recognize Israeli Sign Language as an official language for Deaf people in Israel. In March 2017, the university hosted a ceremony in which Pinto presented a certificate of appreciation from the Center for the Deaf Studies to Rivka Carmi, the president of the university, for its actions.

In 2017, Pinto initiated a bill to make public service announcements on the television in sign language, which was led by MK Issawi Frej and MK Eitan Cabel. Later that year, in cooperation with the Ruderman Family Foundation, Pinto arranged a meeting with Academy Award winning actress Marlee Matlin with the community of the Deaf and hard of hearing people in Israel. Over 300 people attended the event, hosted at the Tel Aviv Cinematheque.

Over the years Pinto has spearheaded public campaigns for better inclusion of Deaf people in society. She had dealt with problems in the education system, the lack of accessibility to health services and lack of adequate public infrastructure.
Since 2015 Pinto has worked to strengthen the ties between Israel and the countries of the world, to improve the visibility of the population of Deaf and hard of hearing and the Advancement of Israel, and was chosen to represent Israel at a conference of the World Federation of the Deaf in November 2017 in Budapest in Hungary. During the conference, Pinto learned about a global initiative to prevent the sterilization of Deaf women. Pinto also met Helga Stevens, a Deaf woman and a member of the European Parliament, and told her about the Deaf community in Israel versus the Deaf communities in Europe. At her speech at the Federation, Pinto spoke about the importance of integrating Deaf and hard of hearing people who use both sign language and non-sign language as one whole population. Upon her return to Israel, Pinto was interviewed on Channel 20 about it.

In the beginning of October 2017, Pinto turned to welfare minister Haim Katz and asked him that during the intermediate days of Sukkot and Passover, the telephone relay service should be operated by the Institute for the Advancement of the Deaf. In the beginning of December 2017, Katz replied Pinto that her request had been received, and that the service would be operated on the basis of a shortened working day.
	 
On 5 December 2017, Pinto told the Knesset Science and Technology Committee that Deaf and hard of hearing customers do not hear their names on the announcement after ordering self-service meals, and suggested that the business would lend them a vibrating sign which would be drawn when their order was ready.
	 	

On 12 July 2021, Pinto made her first speech at the Knesset plenum.

Pinto announced on 3 August 2022 that she would not join Zionist Spirit (a merger of Yamina and Derekh Eretz) ahead of the 2022 Israeli legislative election. She had joined the National Unity Party's electoral list on 22 August.

Personal life 
Pinto lives in Ramat Gan, and is married to Michael Kadosh, a player in the Israeli Futsal national team and an employee as an engineer in telecommunications in Israel. They have one son.

See also 
 Deaf Culture

References

External links 

  
 Shirley Pinto Kadosh on the Knesset website 
 

1989 births
Living people
Deaf activists
Israeli deaf people
Deaf politicians
Members of the Knesset with disabilities
Israeli activists
Jewish Israeli politicians
Members of the 24th Knesset (2021–2022)
People from Kiryat Bialik
Women members of the Knesset
Yamina politicians